The 2012 Missouri gubernatorial election was held on November 6, 2012, to elect the Governor of Missouri. Incumbent Democratic Governor Jay Nixon won re-election against the Republican nominee, businessman Dave Spence, despite incumbent President Barack Obama losing Missouri on the same day to Republican nominee Mitt Romney. , this was the last time a Democrat won the governorship of Missouri.

Democratic primary

Candidates
 William Campbell
 Jay Nixon, incumbent governor
 Clay Thunderhawk

Results
The Democratic primary was held on August 8, 2012.

Republican primary

Candidates
 Bill Randles, businessman and corporate defense lawyer
 Fred Sauer, investment executive and anti-abortion activist
 Dave Spence, businessman
 John Weiler

Polling

Results

Libertarian primary

Candidates
 Jim Higgins, former officer of the Libertarian Party of Missouri

Declined
 Leonard Steinman

Results

General election

Debates
Complete video of debate, C-SPAN, September 21, 2012

Predictions

Polling

Republican primary

General election

Results
Nixon won with a comfortable 12.3% margin, somewhat closer than his 2008 victory. Even with President Barack Obama losing the state by a nine-point margin, Nixon and Senator Claire McCaskill both won reelection easily. Like his Senatorial colleague, Nixon was able to get a huge number of votes from rural areas. Both Nixon and McCaskill were declared the winners of their respective races even before the known Democratic strongholds of St. Louis and Kansas City came in.

By congressional district
Nixon won 5 of 8 congressional districts.

See also
 2012 United States gubernatorial elections
 2012 United States Senate election in Missouri
 2012 United States House of Representatives elections in Missouri
 2012 United States presidential election in Missouri
 2012 Missouri lieutenant gubernatorial election
 2012 Missouri Attorney General election
 2012 Missouri State Treasurer election
 2012 Missouri Secretary of State election
 Political party strength in Missouri

References

External links
 Elections from the Missouri Secretary of State

Campaign sites (Archived)
Jay Nixon for Governor
Dave Spence for Governor
Jim Higgins for Governor

Missouri
Governor
2012